The following is a list of films produced in the Kannada film industry in India in 1964, presented in alphabetical order.

See also
Kannada films of 1963
Kannada films of 1965

References

External links
 Kannada Movies of 1964's at the Internet Movie Database
 http://www.bharatmovies.com/kannada/info/moviepages.htm
 http://www.kannadastore.com/

1964
Kannada
Films, Kannada